Teri Ann Garr (born December 11, 1944) is an American former actress, dancer, and comedian. She frequently appeared in comedic roles throughout her career, which spans four decades and includes over 140 credits in film and television. Her accolades include an Academy Award nomination, a BAFTA Award nomination, and a National Board of Review Award.

Born in Lakewood, Ohio, Garr was raised in North Hollywood, California. She is the third child of a comedic-actor father and a studio costumer mother. In her youth, Garr trained in ballet and other forms of dance. She began her career as a teenager with small roles in television and film in the early 1960s, including appearances as a dancer in six Elvis Presley musicals. After spending two years attending college, Garr left Los Angeles, and studied acting at the Lee Strasberg Institute in New York City. Her self-described "big break" as an actress was landing a role in the 1968 Star Trek episode "Assignment: Earth" after which she said, "I finally started to get real acting work."

Garr gained prominence for her roles in Francis Ford Coppola's thriller The Conversation (1974), Mel Brooks' comedy Young Frankenstein (1974), and Steven Spielberg's science fiction film Close Encounters of the Third Kind (1977). She earned an Academy Award nomination for Best Supporting Actress for her role in the Sydney Pollack comedy Tootsie (1982). She reunited with Coppola appearing in his musical One from the Heart (1982), starred opposite Michael Keaton in the family film Mr. Mom (1983), and acted in Martin Scorsese's black comedy After Hours (1985).

Garr's quick wit and charming banter made her a sought after guest on late-night shows such as The Tonight Show Starring Johnny Carson and Late Night with David Letterman. In the 1990s, she appeared in two films by Robert Altman: The Player (1992) and Prêt-à-Porter (1994), followed by supporting roles in Michael (1996) and Ghost World (2001). She also appeared on television as Phoebe Abbott in three episodes of the sitcom Friends (1997–98). In 2002, Garr announced that she had been diagnosed with multiple sclerosis, the symptoms of which had affected her ability to perform beginning in the 1990s. She retired from acting in 2011.

Early life
Teri Ann Garr was born December 11, 1944, in Lakewood, Ohio, a suburb west of Cleveland. Her father, Eddie Garr (born Edward Leo Gonnoud), was a vaudeville performer, comedian, and actor, whose career peaked when he briefly took over the lead role in the Broadway drama Tobacco Road. Her mother, Phyllis Lind Garr (born Emma Schmotzer), was a dancer, a Rockette, wardrobe mistress, and model. Her father was of Irish descent and her maternal grandparents were Austrian immigrants. Garr has two older brothers, Ed and Phil. She spent her early life in Cleveland, and the family briefly relocated to New Jersey before settling in Los Angeles, California.

When Garr was eleven, her father died in Los Angeles of a heart attack. She recalled that his death "left us bereft, without any kind of income. And I saw my mother be this incredibly strong, creative woman who put three kids through college—one of my brothers is a surgeon. Any kind of lessons we wanted, we had to have scholarships or sweep the floors. It had to be free. And so we always had to try harder. That was instilled in me very early." During her youth, Garr expressed interest in dancing, and trained extensively in ballet. "I'd go for three, four hours a day; my feet would be bleeding," she recalled. "I'd take buses all over the city just to go to the best dancing schools. You could just stand there and be quiet and beat yourself up, push the body." Garr graduated from North Hollywood High School, and attended San Fernando Valley State College (now California State University, Northridge) for two years before dropping out and relocating to New York City to further pursue acting. In New York, she studied at the Actors Studio and the Lee Strasberg Theatre and Film Institute.

Career

Early films and stage
Early in her career, she was credited as Terri Garr, Terry Garr, Teri Hope, or Terry Carr. Her movie debut was as an extra in A Swingin' Affair (1963). During her senior year, she auditioned for the cast of the Los Angeles road company production of West Side Story, where she met one of the most important people in her early career, David Winters, who became her friend, dance teacher, and mentor. Winters cast her in many of his early movies and projects.

Garr began as a background go-go dancer in uncredited roles in youth-oriented films and TV shows choreographed by Winters, including Pajama Party (a beach party film), the T.A.M.I. Show, Shindig!, Shivaree, Hullabaloo, Movin' with Nancy, and six Elvis Presley features (many of which were also choreographed by Winters, including Presley's most profitable film, Viva Las Vegas). When asked in a magazine interview about how she landed jobs in so many Presley films, Garr answered, "One of the dancers in the road show of West Side Story (David Winters) started to choreograph movies, and whatever job he got, I was one of the girls he'd hire. So he was chosen to do Viva Las Vegas. That was my first movie."

She often appeared on television during this time, performing as a go-go dancer on several musical variety shows, along with friend Toni Basil, such as Shindig! and Hullabaloo. In 1966, Garr made one appearance on Batman (episode seven, uncredited). In 1968, she appeared in both The Andy Griffith Show and Mayberry R.F.D. and was in two episodes of It Takes a Thief.

Film and television; critical acclaim

Her first speaking role in a motion picture was a brief appearance as a damsel in distress in The Monkees' film Head (1968), written by Jack Nicholson; Garr got the role after meeting Nicholson in an acting class. "He wrote the script for Head, so all of us in the class got little tiny parts in the movie," she recalled. "I was… Who was I? Oh yes, I was the girl dying of a snakebite, who falls off the Conestoga wagon and says, 'Quick, suck it before the venom reaches my heart!' " Earlier in that year, she landed her first significant TV role, featured as secretary Roberta Lincoln in the Star Trek episode "Assignment: Earth", designed as a backdoor pilot episode for a new series that was not commissioned. "Star Trek was the first job where I had a fairly big (for me) speaking part," Garr related in her memoir, "I played Roberta Lincoln, a dippy secretary in a pink and orange costume with a very short skirt. Had the spin-off succeeded, I would have continued on as an earthling agent, working to preserve humanity. In a very short skirt." This led to her being, in her words, "cast as birdbrained lasses," in episodes of other TV shows.

In 1972, she landed a regular role in The Ken Berry "WOW" Show, a summer replacement series. Afterwards, she was a regular cast member on The Sonny & Cher Comedy Hour, dancing and acting in comedy sketches.

Garr appeared in a string of highly successful films in the mid-to-late 1970s, including a supporting role in Francis Ford Coppola's thriller The Conversation (1974). This was followed with her role as Inga, an assistant to Dr. Frederick Frankenstein, in the Mel Brooks horror comedy Young Frankenstein (1974), which marked a career breakthrough. She then appeared in a dramatic role in Steven Spielberg's science-fiction film Close Encounters of the Third Kind (1977) as the wife of Richard Dreyfuss's character; in Oh, God! (1977) as the wife of John Denver's character; and the drama The Black Stallion (1979) as the mother of the boy protagonist.

In 1978, Garr appeared off-Broadway in a production of One Crack Out by Canadian playwright David French, playing the wife of Charlie, a pool hustler in Toronto. Richard Eder of The New York Times noted that Garr "manages an attractive uncertainty and devotion as Charlie's wife."

In 1982, she starred opposite Dustin Hoffman in the comedy Tootsie (1982), playing an actress whose actor friend (Hoffman) disguises himself as a woman to further his career. For her role, she was nominated for an Academy Award for Best Supporting Actress. She then appeared in the comedy Mr. Mom (1983) as the wife of Michael Keaton's character, followed by a supporting role in Martin Scorsese's After Hours (1985). In 1992, Teri played Marge Nelson in Mom and Dad Save the World, a sci-fi adventure family romantic comedy film.

Later work and television

Garr had a recurring role on McCloud, and appeared on M*A*S*H, The Bob Newhart Show, The Odd Couple, Maude, Barnaby Jones, and Paul Sand in Friends and Lovers. She hosted Saturday Night Live three times (in 1980, 1983, and 1985), and was a frequent visitor on The Tonight Show Starring Johnny Carson.

As a recurring guest on Late Night with David Letterman, Garr was renowned for her unscripted banter with David Letterman, who once goaded her into showering in his office while the camera rolled. Letterman later apologized to Garr, stating that he came to realize the constant requests for her to shower were "maybe kind of a sexist thing to do."

In 1989, she appeared in Let It Ride, also opposite Dreyfuss. In the late 1990s, Garr landed a role as recurring character Phoebe Abbott in Friends, the estranged birth mother of Phoebe Buffay.

Garr's career began to slow in the late 1990s after a neurologist informed her that symptoms she had been experiencing for many years were those of multiple sclerosis. In film, she appeared in minor supporting roles, including a witch in the children's film Casper Meets Wendy (1998) and the mother of Michelle Williams in the political comedy Dick (1999). This was followed by an uncredited role in Terry Zwigoff's Ghost World (2001). She also provided the voice of Mary McGinnis in two Batman animated films: Batman Beyond: The Movie (1999), and Batman Beyond: Return of the Joker (2000).

Garr returned to the stage in 2000, appearing in numerous off-Broadway performances of The Vagina Monologues that fall opposite Sanaa Lathan and Julianna Margulies. She subsequently had minor supporting roles in the Christmas comedy film Unaccompanied Minors (2006), and the independent comedies Expired and Kabluey (both 2007).

Retirement
In 2006, Garr published an autobiography, Speedbumps: Flooring It Through Hollywood, which details her career and health struggles after her diagnosis of multiple sclerosis. Garr appeared on The Moth Radio Hour broadcast of December 9, 2009, to tell a humorous reminiscence, "Wake Up Call".

Garr last acted on television in 2011. She appeared at the 19th Annual Race to Erase MS event in 2012.

Personal life

In the early 1980s, Garr was in a seven-year relationship with film executive Roger Birnbaum. After separating from Birnbaum, Garr was in a seven-year relationship with David Kipper, a physician, to whom she was introduced by Carrie Fisher. In 1993, Garr married building contractor John O'Neil, and that same year, in November, they were present when their adopted daughter Molly O'Neil was born. The couple divorced in 1996.

Health issues
In October 2002, Garr confirmed that she had been diagnosed with multiple sclerosis. After years of uncertainty and secrecy about her diagnosis, Garr explained her reasons for deciding to go public: "I'm telling my story for the first time so I can help people. I can help people know they aren't alone and tell them there are reasons to be optimistic because, today, treatment options are available."

In interviews, Garr has said that she first started noticing symptoms while she was in New York filming Tootsie around 1982. After disclosing her condition, she became a National Ambassador for the National Multiple Sclerosis Society and National Chair for the Society's Women Against MS program (WAMS). In November 2005, Garr was honored as the society's Ambassador of the Year. The same year, she revealed her treatment regimen for the disease, which included regular steroid injections to help manage symptoms. Closer reported in 2015 that she credited her positive attitude and her family's support for helping her fight the disease.

In December 2006, Garr had a ruptured brain aneurysm. The aneurysm left her in a coma for a week, but after therapy, she regained speech and motor skills, and in 2008 she appeared on Late Show with David Letterman to promote Expired, a 2007 film in which she played one of a set of twins.

Political activism
In March 1988, Garr was arrested for trespassing in Mercury, Nevada, during a protest against nuclear weapons testing in the area.

Garr has participated in events for The Trevor Project, a nonprofit gay youth suicide prevention organization.

Legacy
Garr has been called a "comedic legend." In 1982, film critic Pauline Kael called her "the funniest neurotic dizzy dame on the screen." She has been named as an influence by numerous performers, including Jenna Fischer and Tina Fey.

Accolades

Filmography

Bibliography
 Speedbumps: Flooring It Through Hollywood

Notes

References

Works cited

External links

 
 
 
 

1944 births
Actresses from Cleveland
Actresses from Los Angeles
American anti–nuclear weapons activists
American film actresses
American television actresses
American voice actresses
American female dancers
American dancers
American women comedians
American people of Austrian descent
American people of Irish descent
California State University, Northridge alumni
Living people
Lee Strasberg Theatre and Film Institute alumni
People from Lakewood, Ohio
People with multiple sclerosis
20th-century American actresses
21st-century American actresses
20th-century American comedians
21st-century American comedians
North Hollywood High School alumni